Smales is an English surname. Notable people with this surname include:

 Alastair Smales (born 1962), Australian swimmer
 Clare Smales (born 1975), British journalist
 Daniel Smales (born 1990), English actor
 Ian Smales (born 1968), English rugby league football player
 John Smales (1888–1930), English rugby league football player
 Kenneth Smales (1927–2015), English cricket player
 Thomas Smales (1934–2017), English rugby league football player
 Tommy Smales (born 1939), English rugby league football player